Thom Brodeur is an American businessman, media personality and brand builder. He is the CEO of Sky Wellness – a company that makes, markets, and sells premium THC free, Broad Spectrum, Full Spectrum and THC free Isolate Hemp-derived CBD products for people and their animals. He is also the CEO of N2 Packaging – an emerging leader in sustainable packaging for the cannabis industry. 

Previously, Thom served as the CEO of Yandy.com. While at Yandy he led efforts to brand the company, expand its customer base, and drive growth in its core lingerie and costume businesses while accelerating growth in its emerging swimwear and everyday intimates’ categories. Yandy.com was the official swimwear and active wear sponsors of the 2017 Miss USA and Miss Teen USA competitions (Yandy.com Is Official Swimsuit Sponsor of 2017 Miss USA Competition – WWD).

Education 
Thom Brodeur earned bachelor’s degrees in political science and economics from Youngstown State University and holds Executive MBA certificates from the renowned Thunderbird School of Global Management.

Career 
Brodeur has served in executive leadership roles in technology, digital marketing and media companies including GoDaddy where he was the company’s first chief marketing officer. Brodeur was Marketwired's executive vice president, global development, EmpowHER, president and COO, Digital Air Strike, COO, Maria Shireen, president and COO. A community leader and philanthropist, Thom has served on Boards of Directors and Executive Committees of The American Electronics Association, the Mayor’s Bio Roadmap Steering Committee, the Governor’s Council on Innovation and Technology, and the Phoenix Sister Cities Commission. Brodeur was a founding Board member of the Arizona Software and Internet Association and led its rebranding effort to become what is today the state’s largest technology industry trade association - The Arizona Technology Council.

Currently, he serves as the CEO of N2 Packaging Systems LLC and Sky Wellness. Thom has been recognized in the Cambridge Who’s Who of Global Marketing Executives, by The Phoenix Business Journal as one of the 40 Under 40 as well as Most Admired Leaders and was a Phoenix Business Journal finalist for CEO of the Year. Brodeur has been featured in dozens of domestic and international media outlets and has made appearances on business radio, television news programs and as a co-host and judge of a regional pitch event for ABC’s Shark Tank with Daymond John (thom brodeur - AZ Tech Beat).

References 

Living people
Youngstown State University alumni
Arizona State University alumni
Year of birth missing (living people)
American producers